Empower Up, formerly known as CREAM (Computer Reuse Education And Marketing), a 501(c)(3), was a computer recycling center in SW Washington. Started in mid-2002, Empower Up took old electronics in for donation, and recycled/distributed them.

History
Empower Up's history can be traced back to a collection event started by the City of Vancouver and Clark County in June 2001. The success of this collection prompted the city to start another collection in January 2002, to collect only reusable computers and monitors for the community. Due to the success of the second event, comments by sponsors, and the general public showed an interest in these collections.

In mid-2002, after both an event for re-usage and recycling of computers, departments of the City of Vancouver created the program Computer REuse and Marketing, or CREAM. This new organization would have a permanent location, permanent collection sites, and mobile collection units to travel around the area. CREAM would also make sure of the proper disposal of materials in electronics not suitable for redistribution. By 2008, CREAM had distributed 250 refurbish computers to needy families (with the help of Salvation Army Family Services), and recycled 3.5 million pounds of electronic waste.

Near the beginning of 2009, due to new laws in Washington, it was recommended that the organization become an independent non-profit organization. With the help of Habitat for Humanity, and Clark County ReStore, the state created a 3-year plan to make CREAM an independent nonprofit. In February 2009, they established their first permanent building in Vancouver.

In April 2010, CREAM's name was changed to Empower Up, with the motto "Technology Reuse In Action", and changed to their current logo.

In October 2013 Empower Up moved to 3206 N E 52nd Street Vancouver Washington 98663 on St Johns Road. They expanded the Reuse store and added an eBay store. 

On 27 August 2016 Empower Up was shut down permanently, citing "economic pressure".

Media
Empower Up has recently received attention from many local and state news sources. They have been featured in places such as KATU local news, The Vancouver Voice, and The Columbian.

See also
 Free Geek
 Nonprofit Technology Resources
 World Computer Exchange
 Computer recycling
 Digital divide in the United States
 Global digital divide

References

External links
 Empower Up Home Page

Organizations established in 2002
Non-profit organizations based in Vancouver, Washington
Recycling organizations
Recycling in the United States
Clark County, Washington
2002 establishments in Washington (state)
Charities
Charities